EUNIS is an abbreviation for
 European Nature Information System
 European University Information Systems Organization
 Extreme Ultraviolet Normal Incidence Spectrograph, a sounding rocket instrument for observing the solar corona.